Procoronis swinhoeiana is a species of moth of the family Tortricidae first described by Lord Walsingham in 1890. It is found on Seram and the Moluccas and in Myanmar and New Caledonia. The habitat consists of bamboo and secondary forests.

References

Moths described in 1890
Enarmoniini